Pogogyne serpylloides is a species of flowering plant in the mint family known by the common names thymeleaf mesamint and thymeleaf beardstyle. It is endemic to central California, where it grows in grassy habitat in coastal and inland mountain ranges and foothills. It is a petite aromatic annual herb growing decumbent or upright, often reaching no more than a centimeter in height even when erect in form, sometimes larger. The slender stem is sometimes branched. The inflorescence is a series of rounded, headlike clusters, with occasional single flowers emerging at leaf axils. The tiny tubular flower is 2 to 5 millimeters long and has a lobed, lipped mouth. It is lavender in color, sometimes with faint white markings in the mouth.

References

External links
Jepson Manual Treatment
USDA Plants Profile
Photo gallery

serpylloides
Endemic flora of California
Flora of the Sierra Nevada (United States)
Natural history of the California chaparral and woodlands
Natural history of the California Coast Ranges
Natural history of the San Francisco Bay Area
Plants described in 1868
Flora without expected TNC conservation status